The National Sporting Club was a club founded in London in 1891, which did more to establish the sport of boxing in Great Britain than any other organisation.

Origins
The club was founded on 5 March 1891 as a private club. Its premises were at 43 King Street, Covent Garden, London. The founders were John Fleming and A.F. "Peggy" Bettinson, and Hugh Lowther, 5th Earl of Lonsdale was its first president.

The club was run under very strict rules regarding both the boxers and the members. Bouts would take place after dinner, before about 1,300 members and guests. The bouts would be fought in silence as no talking was permitted during the rounds. The club built up a great tradition of sportsmanship and fair play.

In 1909, the club's president introduced the Lonsdale Belt as a prize to be awarded to the British champion at each weight. The belts were made from porcelain and twenty-two carat gold.

Demise
In the 1920s boxing became a sport with mass appeal. Boxers could appear at large venues and earn more money than at the N.S.C. As a result, the club was forced to open its doors to the public in October 1928. However, in 1929, it was forced to close its premises in Covent Garden and move for a while to The Stadium Club, Holborn before finally moving to 21 Soho Square in January 1930.

A new company was formed in 1930 to try to revive the club's fortunes, and there were ambitious plans to build new headquarters but these came to nothing. In 1936, an enthusiast, John Harding, set up a new committee, which took over the Empress Hall and put on boxing shows there.

In 1938 the club moved to the Hotel Splendide, Piccadilly, but the war came and the club went into voluntary liquidation.

In 1929, a new organisation, the British Boxing Board of Control, was formed to control the sport. Most of the board of the new organisation were senior members of the N.S.C. The N.S.C. was given a permanent seat on the new Board of Control and retained this privilege until 1937. After this time it became regarded as a promoter of boxing contests.

New club formed
In 1947 a new club was formed with the same name, but no connection with the old club. It took over the Empress Club in Berkley Street in 1951. In 1951 the club moved to the Café Royal, Regent Street. In 1982 the club moved to Grosvenor House, Park Lane, but has since moved back to the Café Royal where it held sporting events until its closure in 2009. The banqueting side of the business is currently awaiting the re-opening of The Savoy where it plans to re-launch its sporting lunches and dinners

British Sports Book Awards
Since 2003, the club has hosted a multi-category sports book literary award now known as the British Sports Book Awards.

Sources
 Maurice Golesworthy, Encyclopaedia of Boxing (Eighth Edition) (1988), Robert Hale Limited, 

Boxing in the United Kingdom
Professional boxing organizations
Boxing
Gentlemen's clubs in London
1891 establishments in the United Kingdom
Boxing clubs in the United Kingdom